Village Vet may also refer to:


Arts and entertainment 
 Village Vets Australia, an Australian television series starring veterinarians

Books 
 Village Vet, a book by Mary Bowring
 Vet in a Village, a book by Hugh Lasgarn

Other uses 
 Village Vet, A brand of veterinary practices based in the United Kingdom, a subsidiary of the Linnaeus Group
 The Village Vet, an American veterinary company unrelated to the practice group in the United Kingdom 
 The Village Veterinary Group is a small animal practice with vet surgeries in Caterham, Merstham, Smallfield and Tanhouse in Surrey.